A lock of hair is a piece or pieces of hair that has been cut from, or remains singly on, a human head, most commonly bunched or tied together in some way. A standard dictionary definition defines a lock as a tress, curl, or ringlet of hair.

Symbolic value

Locks of hair carry symbolic value and have been utilized throughout history in various religious, superstitious, and sentimental roles.
 A traditional belief maintains that owning a lock of hair from another's head gives one power over that individual, in the same manner that owning a piece of clothing or image of an individual grants the owner such powers.
 Historically, giving a lock of one's hair to someone has been considered a sign of love and devotion, especially before an impending separation. It is still a popular trope in fiction, particularly the romance genre.
 During antiquity, Roman girls who were about to be married offered locks of hair to Jove (Jupiter) in his forest god aspect, Virbius (Virbio).
 An ancient and worldwide (e.g. China, Egypt, Thailand, Albania, Ukraine, India, Israel, etc.) pre-adolescent custom was to shave children's heads but leave a lock of hair (sometimes several locks) remaining on their heads. Upon reaching adulthood the lock of hair was usually cut off (see Rites of passage).
 The scalplock was a lock of hair kept throughout a man's life. Like childhood locks, the scalplock was also a worldwide phenomenon, particularly noted amongst eastern woodland Native American tribes (see Iroquois, Huron, Mahican, Mohawk) in North America (see also Scalping and Mohawk hairstyle).
 Sviatoslav I of Kiev was reported to have worn a scalp lock according to Leo the Deacon, a Byzantine historian. Later Ukrainian Cossacks (Zaporozhians) sported scalplocks called oseledets or khokhol. In India this custom remains active but usually only amongst orthodox Hindus. See Sikha.
 In Mark Twain's travel book The Innocents Abroad, he describes Moroccan men sporting scalp locks.
 The Imazighen (Berber) men of Morocco had the custom of shaving the head but leaving a single lock of hair on either the crown, left, or right side of the head, so that the angel Azrael is able "...to pull them up to heaven of the Last Day."
 A common superstition holds that a lock of hair from a baby's first haircut should be kept for good luck.
An old Irish superstition holds that it is unlucky to accept a lock of hair (or a four-footed beast) from a lover.
 A lock of Beethoven's hair, cut from his head in 1827, was auctioned in 1994 through Sotheby's of London. Research on the hair determined that the composer's lifelong illness was caused by lead poisoning.
 A Polish plait (Koltun in Polish, meaning "Knot", but often referred to in English as an "Elf-Lock") is a lock of matted hair similar to a dreadlock. Due to a scalp disease (Plica polonica), King Christian IV of Denmark (1577–1648) had a Polish plait hanging from the left side of his head which in an engraved portrait in the Royal Collection is adorned by a large pearl. His courtiers were said to have adopted the hairstyle in order to flatter the king. Due to superstitious beliefs, the Polish plait used to be particularly common in Poland (hence its name). Initially, the plait was treated as an amulet, supposed to bring good health, as the plait was supposed to take the illness "out" of the body, and therefore it was rarely cut off.
A lovelock was popular amongst European "men of fashion" from the end of the 16th century until well into the 17th century. The lovelock was a long lock of generally plaited (braided) hair made to rest over the left shoulder (the heart side) to show devotion to a loved one.
 In Victorian times, it was common for bereaved family members to keep locks of hair from deceased children or family members. These locks of hair were seen as mementos and served to comfort the surviving loved ones. These locks of hair were typically kept in lockets, though small jars, and in some cases other kinds of jewelry, were used.  Jewelry could include everything from bracelets, to earrings, as well as various types of brooches (see hair jewellery).

See also

 Ringlet (haircut)
 Dreadlocks, commonly called locks or dreads.
 Goldilocks, a nursery rhyme character so named due to her golden hair
 Payot, sidelocks, or earlocks worn by male Orthodox Jews.

Notes

Sources
 The Golden Bough by James Frazer - Penguin Books, 
 The Innocents Abroad by Mark Twain - Signet Classic, 
 Armies of Medieval Russia 750-1250 by David Nicolle - Osprey Publishing, 
 Daily Life in Ancient India From 200 BC to 700 AD by Jeannine Auboyer - Phoenix Press, 
 The Cossacks by John Ure - The Overlook Press, 
  Ancient Egyptian Hairstyles
  Ukrainian Cossack Display Group
  Common Superstitions
  Ancient Legends, Mystic Charms, and Superstitions of Ireland

Human hair
Superstitions
Symbolism